Integralismo Lusitano (English: "Lusitanian Integralism") was a Portuguese integralist political movement founded in Coimbra in 1914 that advocated traditionalism but not conservatism. It was against parliamentarism but favoured decentralization, national syndicalism, the Roman Catholic Church and the monarchy. Its members included an amalgam of rightists, monarchists, Catholics and nationalists.

Origin 
Lusitanian Integralism is a variant of integralism that evolved in Portugal, the term "Lusitania" being derived from the Latin term for the southern region of what is now Portugal. The movement was created to address the threats of anticlerical liberalism, socialism, populist and revolution. The movement drew inspiration from the French royalist movement Action française and it considered an authoritarian, nationalist and corporatist monarchy to be ideal. The movement was particularly active during the Portuguese First Republic, which it criticised.

Activities 
It initially supported the last king of Portugal, Manuel II but refused to back him after 1920 after the attempts to restore the monarchy that were initiated in Monsanto Forest Park, Lisbon, and during the Monarchy of the North, but it supported Manuel's cousin, Miguel of Braganza.

Integralismo Lusitano's notable members included António Sardinha, Alberto de Monsaraz, José Adriano Pequito Rebelo, José Hipólito Vaz Raposo, João Ameal, Leão Ramos Ascensão, Luís de Almeida Braga, and Francisco Rolão Preto. Preto later asserted himself as leader of the National Syndicalists (Movimento Nacional-Sindicalista) and became an opponent of António de Oliveira Salazar and the Estado Novo regime.

The leadership remained active in 1917–1918, when it supported the leadership of Sidónio Pais, but it also backed the Ditadura Nacional (National Dictatorship), established after the 28 May 1926 coup d'état. It adopted part of the Integralismo Lusitano's ideology.

When Manuel II died without heirs in 1932, the movement rallied all monarchists behind the descendants of Miguel, who had been exiled after the Liberal Wars. 

Integralismo Lusitano published a journal called Nação Portuguesa, which collaborated with other figures for its counter-revolutionary publications. It was founded by Raposo.

See also
 Monarchy of the North
 Brazilian Integralism
 Patrianovism

References

 Ramos Ascensão, Leão, O Integralismo Lusitano, Edições Gama, 1943. (https://web.archive.org/web/20140531114649/http://www.causanacional.net/INTEGRALISMO.pdf)

External links 
 Integralismo lusitano: "made in France"?, Stewart Lloyd-Jones

 
Political parties established in 1914
20th century in Portugal
Political history of Portugal
Monarchist parties in Portugal
Defunct political parties in Portugal
1914 establishments in Portugal
National syndicalism